Healthy Serbia (ZS) is a right-wing political party founded in 2017 by Milan Stamatović, Mayor of Čajetina.

History 
After leaving the Democratic Party of Serbia and further disagreements with the President of the Serbian People's Party Nenad Popović over Popović's support for the ruling party's leader Aleksandar Vučić's candidacy at the 2017 Serbian Presidential election, Milan Stamatović decided to run for President himself. Together with his supporters, he founded the "For a Healthy Serbia" Citizens' Group, which nominated him. Stamatović received 1.15% of the overall votes in Serbia, but the fact that he won 61.23% of votes in his hometown of Čajetina encouraged him to found his own political party.

Healthy Serbia was officially founded on 5 June 2017 in the western Serbian village of Ljubiš, where Stamatović received 99% of the votes. Among the founders were famous Serbian poet Ljubivoje Ršumović and Serbian writer Milan Paroški. At that occasion, Stamatović said that "Healthy Serbia would be an authentic regional party, but also a party devoted to making entire Serbia healthier by working from the interior, and not from Belgrade."

On 21 August 2017, Healthy Serbia and Dveri signed an agreement on joint political action. Stamatović said that neither of these two political parties have ever flirted with the ruling Serbian Progressive Party, which he considers to be a huge advantage. He also mentioned that these two political organizations do not wish to topple the Government on the streets, but through elections.

In the 2020 parliamentary elections, Healthy Serbia participated in a coalition with the conservative Better Serbia.

Electoral results

Parliamentary elections

Presidential elections

Notable members 
This is a list of notable members of the Healthy Serbia:

 Milan Stamatović, Mayor of Čajetina
 Ljubivoje Ršumović, poet (2017–present)
 Milan Paroški, writer (2017–present)

Notes and references

Notes

References 

Conservative parties in Serbia
Eastern Orthodox political parties
Eurosceptic parties in Serbia
Nationalist parties in Serbia
Political parties established in 2017
2017 establishments in Serbia
Eastern Orthodoxy and far-right politics
Serb nationalist parties
National conservative parties
Right-wing populism in Serbia
Right-wing parties in Europe